"The Hymn of Joy" (often called "Joyful, Joyful We Adore Thee" after the first line) is a poem written by Henry van Dyke in 1907 with the intention of musically setting it to the famous "Ode to Joy" melody of the final movement of Ludwig van Beethoven's final symphony, Symphony No. 9.

Background
Van Dyke wrote this poem in 1907 while staying at the home of Williams College president Harry Augustus Garfield. He was serving as a guest preacher at Williams at the time. He told his host that the local Berkshire Mountains had been his inspiration. 

The lyrics were first published in 1911 in Van Dyke's Book of Poems, Third Edition.

Van Dyke wrote of this hymn:
These verses are simple expressions of common Christian feelings and desires in this present time—hymns of today that may be sung together by people who know the thought of the age, and are not afraid that any truth of science will destroy religion, or any revolution on earth overthrow the kingdom of heaven. Therefore this is a hymn of trust and joy and hope.

"This hymn is generally considered by hymnologists to be one of the most joyous expressions of hymn lyrics in the English language." It is also used as a Christian song for children.

Original text

References

1907 poems
American Christian hymns
Ludwig van Beethoven
20th-century hymns